Runnel Stone may refer to:
 Rundle Rock, an quarried building material
 An alternate spelling of Runnel Stone